The Minister of Foreign Affairs is the primary government officer in the Commonwealth of the Bahamas mandated to control foreign missions of the country. He is the head of the Ministry of Foreign Affairs. He has the responsibility of implementing the Bahamian government's foreign affairs priorities. The current foreign affairs minister is The Honorable Frederick Audley Mitchell(Bahamas)|.

List of ministers
This is a list of Ministers of Foreign Affairs of the Bahamas:

1973–1984: Paul Adderley
1984–1989: Clement T. Maynard
1989–1990: Charles Carter
1990–1992: Sir Clement T. Maynard
1992–1994: Orville Turnquest
1994–2002: Janet Bostwick
2002–2007: Fred Mitchell
2007–2012: Brent Symonette
2012–2017: Fred Mitchell
2017–2021: Darren Henfield
2021–present: Fred Mitchell

References084274293

External links
Ministry of Foreign Affairs official website

Government ministers of the Bahamas
Foreign relations of the Bahamas